101 East is a multi award-winning weekly television programme, broadcast by Al Jazeera English, that produces in-depth investigative documentaries from across Asia and the Pacific. The show launched in 2006 and operates out of Al Jazeera's Asia bureau in Kuala Lumpur, Malaysia.

Team

101 East has a strong and diverse international team of in-house staff as well as freelance contributors.

Awards

101 East has won a number of industry awards including two Walkley awards, an AIB award, a Royal Television Society award, Human Rights Awards, and medals from the New York Festivals International Television & Film Awards. 101 East has also been nominated for three Emmy Awards.

References

External links
 Official site

Al Jazeera English original programming
Al Jazeera America original programming